Boas Munyonga (born December 15, 1980 in Ndola) is a Zambian judoka. At the 2014 Commonwealth Games in Glasgow, Munyonga won Bronze in 81 kg men's category.  He competed in the men's 81 kg event at the 2012 Summer Olympics and was eliminated in the second round by Takahiro Nakai.

References

1980 births
Living people
Zambian male judoka
Olympic judoka of Zambia
Judoka at the 2012 Summer Olympics
Judoka at the 2014 Commonwealth Games
People from Ndola
Commonwealth Games medallists in judo
Commonwealth Games bronze medallists for Zambia
Medallists at the 2014 Commonwealth Games